John Madsen may refer to:

John Madsen (American football) (born 1983), American football player
John Madsen (footballer) (born 1937), Danish association football player
John Madsen (physicist) (1879–1969), Sir John Percival Vissing Madsen, Australian academic, physicist, engineer and mathematician
John M. Madsen (born 1939), American leader in The Church of Jesus Christ of Latter-day Saints

See also
Jon Madsen (born 1980), American MMA fighter